Ronald de Moura Guedes (born 10 August 2002 in São Miguel do Guamá), or simply Ronald, is a Brazilian footballer. He currently plays for Remo.

Honours

Remo
Copa Verde: 2021
Campeonato Paraense: 2022

References

External links
 Ronald de Moura Guedes at playmakerstats.com (English version of ogol.com.br)
 

2002 births
Living people
Brazilian footballers
Clube do Remo players
Association football forwards